Abraham Riestra (born June 6, 1988) is a Mexican professional footballer who last played for Correcaminos.

External links

References

Liga MX players
Living people
Mexican footballers
1988 births
Place of birth missing (living people)
Association football defenders
Club Celaya footballers
Club Necaxa footballers
Dorados de Sinaloa footballers